John Clements Davis (born October 21, 1938) is an American geologist best known for his research in the application of statistics to geology.  He spent almost his entire professional career with the Kansas Geological Survey, being an Emeritus Scientist since 2003. He then served as Univ-Prof of Reservoir Characterization at the Montanuniversität in Leoben, Austria and is now Chief Geologist for Heinemann Oil GmbH in Austria.
Davis has been a member of several professional societies, most active in the International Association for Mathematical Geosciences, where he was Editor of the Newsletter (1973–1989), Western Treasurer (1972–1980), Secretary General (1980–1984), President (1984–1989) and Distinguished Lecturer (2002).  The Association acknowledged his valuable contributions to the organization and science by presenting him with the Krumbein Medal. Davis also received the Haidinger Medal from the Geologische Bundesanstalt for his contributions to mathematical geology.

Education
Ph.D. in geology, University of Wyoming, 1967
M.S. in geology, University of Wyoming, 1963
B.S. in geology, University of Kansas, 1961

Books
 John C. Davis (2002). Statistics and Data Analysis in Geology.  Wiley & Sons, 3rd edition, 638 p.
 John W. Harbaugh, John C. Davis, Johannes Wendebourg (1995). Computing Risk for Oil Prospects: Principles and Programs.  Pergamon, 452 p.
 John C. Davis, Ute C. Herzfeld, eds., (1993). Computers in Geology—25 Years of Progress.  Oxford University Press, 298 p.
 John W. Harbaugh, John C. Davis, John Doveton (1977). Probability Methods in Oil Exploration. John Wiley & Sons, 284 p.
 John C. Davis, Michael J. McCullagh, eds., (1975). Display & Analysis of Spatial Data.  Wiley & Sons, 378 p.

References

Living people
20th-century American geologists
University of Kansas alumni
University of Wyoming alumni
1938 births
People from Baldwin City, Kansas
People from Neodesha, Kansas
Scientists from Kansas
21st-century American geologists
Academic staff of the University of Leoben
American expatriates in Austria